Sudhir Vyas is an Indian Civil servant and was the Indian ambassador to Germany. Vyas was previously ambassador to Bhutan and the United Arab Emirates. In 2013 Vyas was appointed Secretary (West) in the Ministry of External Affairs (India). A 1977  batch officer of the Indian Foreign Service Vyas retired from the Indian Foreign Service in 2015 and was appointed to the Board of Governors to The Center for Escalation of Peace.

Early life 
Vyas graduated from Indian Institute of Technology Kanpur in 1975. In 1977, he joined the Indian Foreign Service.

References

Indian Foreign Service officers
Ambassadors of India to Germany
IIT Kanpur alumni
Ambassadors of India to the United Arab Emirates
Ambassadors of India to Bhutan
Year of birth missing (living people)
Living people